The Crown Range is a mountain range that lies to the east of the Wakatipu Basin in Otago, New Zealand. It is noted for two features, the Cardrona Alpine Resort, on the slopes of the 1900 metre Mount Cardrona, and a highway, known as the Crown Range Road (formerly State Highway 89), which winds steeply between Arrow Junction, just south of Arrowtown, and Wānaka to the north.

Travelling from Arrowtown towards Wānaka, the Crown Range Road starts at the bottom of the "zig zag". This steep and winding section climbs to the Crown Terrace, a large flat and fertile area capable of growing grain crops. To the left, Glencoe Road leads to Glencoe Station, the large high country station behind Arrowtown. At the end of the Crown Terrace is the Eastburn Road to Eastburn Station, which runs from the Glencoe boundary almost to Cardrona.

Just past the Eastburn Road the road twists and climbs up to the Crown Saddle, where a bronze plaque at the vista point claims that this historic summit, at 1076 m (3530 ft) is the highest sealed road in New Zealand. Officially it is the highest sealed local road and the highest sealed pass or through road, 2m higher than the Desert Road summit on State Highway 1 in the North Island. 

Eastburn Station has provided a number of viewing areas. The distant views down and over Lake Hayes, Arrowtown and the airport to Queenstown are stunning. From the Crown Saddle the road follows the Cardrona creek which becomes the Cardrona River flowing down the iconic snow tussock valley until it opens out at the small settlement of Cardrona.

The area was heavily populated during the Central Otago goldrush of the 1860s, the town of Cardrona, now little more than a dot on the map, briefly having a population of several thousand prospectors. There are visible remains of gold prospecting beside the Crown Range Road over the saddle on the west bank opposite the East Burn Stream two miles over the saddle,  also six miles below the saddle on the east bank.

In 2001, the last section of the Crown Range Road was sealed by the Queenstown Lakes District Council.

References

Mountain ranges of Otago